The 2022 Pecos League season was the 12th season of professional baseball in the Pecos League, an independent baseball league which operates in cities in desert mountain regions throughout California, New Mexico, Arizona, Colorado, Kansas and Texas, since its creation in August 2010. There are 16 Pecos League teams, split evenly between Mountain and Pacific divisions.

The Tucson Saguaros entered the season as the defending champions, having defeated the Roswell Invaders, two games to one, in the league's 2021 championship series.

Andrew Dunn returned as commissioner for the 2022 season.

Season schedule
The 16 teams in the league are split evenly between two divisions, Mountain and Pacific.

For the 2022 season, the league announced three expansion franchises: the Santa Rosa Scuba Divers, Austin Weirdos, and Weimar Hormigas. After competing in 2021, Salina was not included as a member club in 2022.

The season was played with a 50-game schedule with opening day in the Pacific Division on May 26, and opening day in the Mountain Division on June 1. The Regular season in both divisions concluded on July 31.

The Pecos League remains split into Mountain Division and Pacific Division. The Mountain and Pacific Divisions teams are aligned in four-team North and South Divisions. The biggest offseason alignment move is two-time defending Pecos League Champion Tucson Saguaros' move from the Mountain Division to the Pacific Division. 

The top team in each four-team division and two teams that are non-division winners will qualify for the Playoffs. The Playoffs will consist of three rounds, ending with the Champion of the Mountain Division facing the winner of the Pacific Division.

Regular season standings

Mountain Division

Pacific Division 

 y – Clinched division
 x – Clinched playoff spot

Statistical leaders

Hitting

Pitching

Awards

All-star selections

Mountain North Division

Mountain South Division

Pacific North Division

Pacific South Division

End of year awards

Playoffs

Format 
1. Eight teams will qualify for the playoffs

2. The team with the best record in each division will qualify as the division winner. (Mountain North, Mountain South, Pacific North, Pacific South)

3. Each Division Mountain and Pacific will have two teams that are non-division winners with the best record regardless of division.

4. Playoff Location will be determined by ballpark availability, the proximity of travel, and standings. When possible in the first round both teams will host a playoff game.

5. First Round will feature (4) seed vs (1) and seed (2) seed vs (3) seed in a Best of 3 series

6. Second Round will feature Winners of each first-round series in the division finals Best of 3 series

7. Finals Round will feature Winners of Mountain Division vs Winners of Pacific Division at location TBD.

Playoff bracket

See also
2022 Major League Baseball season
2022 American Association season
2022 Frontier League season

References

Pecos League season
Pecos League